Ruslan Igorevich Tarala (born 15 May 1988) is a former Russian professional football player.

Club career
He made his debut in the Russian Premier League in 2005 for FC Torpedo Moscow.

References

1988 births
Sportspeople from Omsk
Living people
Russian footballers
Association football forwards
FC Torpedo Moscow players
FC Dynamo Bryansk players
FC Dynamo Barnaul players
FC Neftekhimik Nizhnekamsk players
FC Irtysh Omsk players
Russian Premier League players